Kings Gap Environmental Education Center is a  Pennsylvania state park in Cooke, Dickinson and Penn Townships, Cumberland County, Pennsylvania, in the United States. The Commonwealth of Pennsylvania acquired the land in 1973, from the C. H. Masland and Son Carpet Company.

History

Human influence on South Mountain, 1750-1900

The origin of the name "Kings Gap" is not known, although it is believed to date back to early settlers in this region. The forests of Kings Gap reflect the influence of the charcoaling industry that began in the 1700s and persisted through the late 1800s. Before the discovery of coal, charcoal fueled the iron furnaces located nearby. Some furnaces were as close as Huntsdale, one mile to the southwest of the entrance to Kings Gap. Iron furnaces required tremendous amounts of charcoal as fuel. In 1786, an average furnace consumed in one day the charcoal produced from one acre of forest. The forests of South Mountain were clearcut on a 20 - 25-year cycle to satisfy the unquenchable thirst for charcoal by nine iron furnaces located in the Kings Gap area. A relatively young forest now exists as a result of these repeated cuttings.

The process of making charcoal demanded great skill and vast quantities of trees. During winter months, wood was cut and stacked. When colliers selected a site for the hearth, they stacked the wood into a conical shape by standing the sticks on end around a central chimney. The dangerous job of firing and tending these hearths belonged to the collier and one or two helpers. These men usually managed as many as eight or nine hearths at one time. To keep the fires smoldering, fires were carefully controlled 24 hours a day for ten days to two weeks -the time needed to produce the charred wood or charcoal.

The colliers lived in crude huts placed near the group of hearths being "coaled." Because of these rough living conditions, charcoaling took place during the milder seasons of the year. After the collier determined that the wood was ready, he extinguished the fires and raked the charcoal into piles. He then loaded the charcoal onto wagons and took it to the furnaces. The discovery of hotter-burning coal eliminated the demand for charcoal and the industry disappeared completely by the end of the 19th century.

The remains of these hearth sites are visible throughout Kings Gap. Flat, dry spots about 30 – 50 feet in diameter remain fairly free of vegetation revealing the location of a former charcoal hearth. Look for pieces of charcoal that sometimes can be found among the forest litter.

The Camerons, 1906–1951
Near the turn of the century, James McCormick Cameron, member of the politically prominent Cameron family from Harrisburg, Pennsylvania purchased many tracts of land in this area. He erected the 32-room stone mansion as a summer home around 1908. This building now houses the training center and offices.

James McCormick Cameron's grandfather, Simon Cameron, was a United States Senate United States Senator from Pennsylvania and served briefly as Secretary of War under Abraham Lincoln. Donald Cameron, father of James, also was a U.S. Senator. Both men amassed fortunes through business interests in banking, steel mills, printing and railroading, among others. James McCormick Cameron]carried forward with the business tradition but shunned politics. He was educated at Harrisburg Academy, Phillips Exeter Academy and Harvard University. A hearing problem accounted for his shy and soft-spoken nature. He did not marry until 1927, when he was 62 years old. He had no children. He divided his time among residences in Harrisburg, Pennsylvania, Donegal in Lancaster County, Pennsylvania, and Kings Gap. Eventually purchasing 2,700 acres, Cameron instituted stewardship practices that helped to protect the land.

Mansion: The mansion is approximately 200 feet long and is built of native Quartzite quarried from a nearby ridge. The 32-room house was designed to resemble an Italian villa with its flat roof, huge windows and flagstone terrace. The use of steel-reinforced concrete for the internal structure of the building is believed to be one of the first such applications in local construction. The materials used in the construction were intended to make the mansion as fireproof as possible. Nevertheless, Mr. Cameron only lived at Kings Gap from May through October, when fire danger is at its lowest.

Ice house: The ice house rises 15 feet above ground level and extends downward 10 feet. The Camerons used it to store vegetables grown in the garden. The ice was brought from Laurel Lake at nearby Pine Grove Furnace until 1931.

Garden: The stone-walled garden provided vegetables for the household during the Cameron residency. A wire fence has been erected in front of the stone wall to discourage deer.

Water tower: The 10,000-gallon capacity wooden tank atop the brick tower supplies water to the surrounding buildings as it did when first constructed. Originally a water-powered pump located in the pumphouse near the foot of the mountain sent water from a spring approximately two miles up hill to the water tower. A well located at the pumphouse now serves as the water source. Gravity flow still feeds all of the buildings from the tank.

Carriage house: The former carriage house and stable now serves as the center's maintenance building. The building contained an apartment on the second floor for the carriage drivers and stable help. An automatic carriage wash in the middle bay and a hand-operated large equipment elevator in the carriage section are evidence of the modern conveniences of the time.

Generator building: Across the road from the carriage house is a stone building that was originally constructed as the generator building. In the 1930s, a 12-volt electrical system powered by two gasoline engines was installed to generate electricity for the mansion. This system has long since been replaced by a public utility service.

Caretaker's house: This two-story brick building was occupied year-round by the caretaker of Kings Gap. The building is now a private residence and is not open to the public.

The Maslands, 1951-1973

After Mr. Cameron's death in 1949, the C. H. Masland and Son Carpet Company of Carlisle purchased the mansion and the surrounding 1,430 acres. Masland refurbished the mansion adding carpet, wallpaper and new furnishings. The building, then called the "Masland Guest House," was used as accommodations for potential clients and as a training site for employees and sales representatives. The bedrooms were used to showcase Masland carpet. The bedroom carpet was changed frequently as product lines were dropped and new designs were added.

The Masland family also became involved in several land management projects, including the planting of the pine plantation located at the base of the mountain. Thirty thousand trees were planted in the 42-acre plot during the 1950s. In addition, the Maslands were responsible for the construction of the pond, which is now used as a site for aquatic studies.

As commercial overnight accommodations became available in the Carlisle, Pennsylvania area for business meetings it was no longer necessary or feasible to operate Kings Gap. The company made the decision to seek a buyer for the property.

Preservation

Working through the Nature Conservancy, the Commonwealth of Pennsylvania acquired the mansion and 1,430 acres of land in 1973. The environmental education center opened in 1977 and the training center opened in 1980.

In 1991, the training center was renamed in honor of William C. Forrey, retiring director of the Pennsylvania Bureau of State Parks. Forrey served as Bureau Director from 1973 through 1991 and was instrumental in acquisition and growth of Kings Gap.

Environmental education

Kings Gap Environmental Education Center is one of four environmental education centers operated by the Pennsylvania Department of Conservation and Natural Resources. The PA DCNR also gives environmental education programs for students, teachers, and the public at Kings Gap. For more information on upcoming environmental education programs call Kings Gap at (717) 486-3799

Recreation

Hiking and picnicking are popular activities at the park.  Kings Gap has many picnic tables throughout the park to enjoy a lunch packed from home.  There are three permanent orienteering courses at Kings Gap Environmental Education Center of different difficulties. Orienteering is a sport that involves using a map and compass to negotiate a designated course. Additional information on orienteering and copies of the course map are available at the center office. The center offers programs on orienteering for beginners in the fall and spring.

Hunting is permitted on several hundred acres of Kings Gap Environmental Education Center.  Hunters are expected to follow the rules and regulations of the Pennsylvania Game Commission. The common game species are gray squirrels, turkey, and white-tailed deer.

There are approximately 20 miles of trails from 19 marked and named trailheads.

Nature

Kings Gap Environmental Education Center has a wide variety of wild plants and animals. Turkey vultures can be seen near the summit of the mountain. Reptiles including the box turtle, five-lined skink, copperhead snakes and timber rattlesnakes. The plant life is diverse as well. Wild blueberry, huckleberry and mountain laurel can be found in the woods with large stands of chestnut oak, white pine, larch and Douglas fir. Vernal pools appear in the springtime. These pools provide habitats and breeding area for amphibians like wood frogs, spotted salamanders, and spring peepers.

Park areas

Mansion Day Use Area

The center's offices and the Mansion Day Use Area are located on the mountaintop, four miles from the entrance of Kings Gap. The patio of the mansion provides a sweeping view of the Cumberland Valley. Turkey vultures are a common site at this vista as they catch the air currents created by the gap.

Kings Gap is suitable habitat for a variety of reptiles, including the box turtle, the five-lined skink (one of Pennsylvania's few lizards), the northern copperhead and the timber rattlesnake. Sightings of these reptiles are not uncommon in the summer months. In the Mansion Day Use Area, copperheads and rattlesnakes are sometimes seen hunting rodents along the stone walls of the mansion patio and garden. Although these snakes are venomous and should be respected, in their natural habitats they retreat when threatened. The timber rattlesnake is classified as a candidate species in Pennsylvania, which means it could receive endangered or threatened status in the future. For additional information on these reptiles, contact the center office.

Chestnut oak dominates the forest while blueberries, huckleberries and mountain laurel make up the shrub layer of the Mansion Day Use area. The Woodland Ecology Trail is a signed interpretive trail that explores this oak forest habitat.

The garden, surrounded by a low stone wall, was used by the original owners of Kings Gap to raise vegetables. Restoration of this site began in January 1992 by the Master Gardeners of Cumberland County, Pennsylvania. The goal of this project is to establish an educational garden that will inspire and teach about the benefits of plants.

The garden is divided into three educational areas. The herb garden displays beds of coloring, cooking, fragrant and healing herbs. The wildlife habitat garden uses native plants in a meadow, pond, woodland and shrub border habitat to demonstrate how a wildlife habitat can be created in a "backyard." Finally, a compost demonstration garden sponsored by the Pennsylvania Bureau of Land Recycling and Waste Management provides examples of seven different composting methods.

Pine Plantation Day Use Area

In contrast to the deciduous forest that covers most of the center grounds, the Pine Plantation lets you experience the shaded environment of a coniferous forest. The plantation of white pine, Douglas fir and larch is located near the entrance of Kings Gap. The C.H. Masland and Sons Carpet Company of Carlisle, Pennsylvania, planted this forest as an experimental tree farm in the 1950s.

During the winters of 1995-97 with assistance from the Pennsylvania Bureau of Forestry, the plantation was thinned to insure its continued health. The removal of excess trees has reduced the competition for sunlight, water and nutrients, lessening the stress on the remaining trees.

The Whispering Pines Trail winds through the plantation. This paved trail includes signs that interpret the coniferous forest.

The pine plantation is home to many animals that prefer a coniferous habitat. The silence of the pine forest is often broken by the chatter of a red squirrel as it sees visitors. In the winter months, one may catch sight of a red-breasted nuthatch as it searches the bark of a nearby pine for food.

In the spring, several vernal ponds dot the landscape. Vernal ponds are temporary ponds that fill up with water in the spring as a result of snowmelt, spring rains and/or elevated ground water tables. These important wetland habitats provide a breeding area for a variety of amphibians including spotted salamanders, spring peepers and wood frogs. Each spring participants in the program, "Experiencing a Spring Night", brave the darkness looking for a very small but very noisy tree frog, the spring peeper.

Kings Gap Hollow Day Use Area

Located two miles from the entrance of Kings Gap, the Pond Day Use Area features a scenic pond and mountain stream. This area is used extensively for environmental education programming because of its diversity of habitats.

Kings Gap Hollow Run is a spring-fed stream that periodically dries up and reveals a stony bottom. However, in the spring when the water flow is at its peak, this stony bottom is home for many aquatic animals. Pick a stone out of the stream and observe the larva of the black fly as they cling to the stone and filter food from the water. Although the adult black fly is considered a pest, the presence of its larva in the stream is an indicator of good water quality.

The black fly larva and the diversity of the other aquatic life found in the stream indicate good water quality, but the stream is vulnerable. Chemical tests reveal low pH and alkalinity levels due to the geology and vegetation of the area. Low levels of alkalinity indicate the stream has a limited capacity to "buffer" any acid that may enter in the form of acid rain or snow. Without this ability to neutralize additional acid, the pH level can drop. A low pH level means a high acid content. When the acid content becomes too high, the stream no longer supports life.

The deciduous forest that brackets the stream features wetland areas categorized by sphagnum moss, cinnamon ferns, skunk cabbage and tulip trees. In late spring and early summer, hikers may chance upon the clump of grass-like leaves with a white to pale green bloom of the lily of the wildflower fly poison.

The pond supports a wealth of aquatic animals adapted to slower water. It includes frogs, salamanders, turtles, snakes and various aquatic insects. A small, floating platform anchored in the pond provides a safe haven for "basking" painted turtles and water snakes. The pond also serves as an aquatic study area for students participating in field learning experiences.

The White Oaks Trail winds through an oak forest. This paved trail includes signs that interpret the ecology of the forest.

Nearby state parks

The following state parks are within  of Kings Gap Environmental Education Center:
Big Spring State Forest Picnic Area (Perry County) 
Caledonia State Park (Adams and Franklin counties)
Codorus State Park (York County) 
Colonel Denning State Park (Cumberland County)
Fowlers Hollow State Park (Perry County)
Gifford Pinchot State Park (York County)
Little Buffalo State Park (Perry County)
Mont Alto State Park (Franklin County)
Pine Grove Furnace State Park (Cumberland County)

References

External links

 

State parks of Pennsylvania
Nature centers in Pennsylvania
Parks in Cumberland County, Pennsylvania
Education in Cumberland County, Pennsylvania
Protected areas established in 1973
1973 establishments in Pennsylvania
Protected areas of Cumberland County, Pennsylvania